Library station is a light rail station in Downtown Salt Lake City, Utah, United States serviced by the Red Line of the Utah Transit Authority's (UTA) TRAX light rail system. The Red Line provides service from the University of Utah to the Daybreak community of South Jordan.

Description 
The station is located at 225 East 400 South (East University Boulevard/SR-186), with the island platform being in the median of 400 South. It is situated immediately north of the main Salt Lake City Public Library building and northwest of the Salt Lake City and County Building. Library is the last eastbound station within the Free Fare Zone in Downtown Salt Lake City. Transportation patrons that both enter and exit bus or TRAX service within the Zone can ride at no charge. As part of the UTA's Art in Transit program, the station features cast bronze books and etched glass windscreens created by Gregg LeFevre entitled By Its Cover. Unlike most TRAX stations, Library does not have a Park and Ride lot. The station is part of a railway right of way that was created specifically for the former University Line. The station was opened on 15 December 2001 as part of the University Line and is operated by the Utah Transit Authority.

Like the Salt Lake Intermodal Hub (as well as City Center and Gallivan Plaza), there is a nearby Greenbike docking station. Greenbike is a bicycle-sharing system within Downtown Salt Lake City that allows members to pick up bicycles from any docking station and then drop it off at any docking station, ideally for trips of 30 minutes or less to avoid additional charges. Greenbike is seasonal and, depending on weather conditions, shuts down operations in November–December and starts up again in March–April.

Notes

References 

TRAX (light rail) stations
Railway stations in the United States opened in 2001
Railway stations in Salt Lake City
2001 establishments in Utah